Festuca dasyclada, also known as the oil shale fescue, is a species of grass in the family Poaceae, it is perennial and prefers temperate biomes. This species is native to Buryatiya, China North-Central, Chita, Inner Mongolia, Manchuria, Mongolia, and Qinghai. Festuca dasyclada was first described in 1934.

References

dasyclada